In Greek mythology, Tiryns (Ancient Greek: Τίρυνθα) was an Argive prince as the son of King Argus and possibly Evadne, daughter of the river-god Strymon and Neaera. He was probably the brother of Ecbasus, Peiras, Epidaurus and Criasus. The city of Tiryns was named after him.

Notes

References 

 Apollodorus, The Library with an English Translation by Sir James George Frazer, F.B.A., F.R.S. in 2 Volumes, Cambridge, MA, Harvard University Press; London, William Heinemann Ltd. 1921. ISBN 0-674-99135-4. Online version at the Perseus Digital Library. Greek text available from the same website.
 Pausanias, Description of Greece with an English Translation by W.H.S. Jones, Litt.D., and H.A. Ormerod, M.A., in 4 Volumes. Cambridge, MA, Harvard University Press; London, William Heinemann Ltd. 1918. . Online version at the Perseus Digital Library
 Pausanias, Graeciae Descriptio. 3 vols. Leipzig, Teubner. 1903.  Greek text available at the Perseus Digital Library.

Characters in Greek mythology
Mythology of Argos